Charles Luther Sifford (June 2, 1922 – February 3, 2015) was an American professional golfer who was the first African American to play on the PGA Tour. He won the Greater Hartford Open in 1967 and the Los Angeles Open in 1969. He also won the United Golf Association's National Negro Open six times, and the PGA Seniors' Championship in 1975.

For his contributions to golf, Sifford was inducted into the World Golf Hall of Fame in 2004. He was awarded the Old Tom Morris Award in 2007, the Presidential Medal of Freedom in 2014, and an honorary doctorate from the University of St Andrews. Lee Trevino referred to Sifford as the "Jackie Robinson" of golf, and Tiger Woods acknowledged that Sifford paved the way for his career.

Early life and career
Sifford was born in Charlotte, North Carolina, in 1922. He began work as a caddy at the age of thirteen. He moved to Philadelphia when he was 17 years old, where he played against local black golfers.

Sifford began golfing professionally in 1948. He competed in the golf tournaments that black golfers organized for themselves as they were excluded from the Professional Golfers' Association of America (PGA). Sifford won the United Golf Association's National Negro Open six times, including consecutive wins from 1952 through 1956. Sifford later worked as a valet and golf instructor to the singer Billy Eckstine, who also financially supported his career when he was unable to find sponsorship.

Sifford first attempted to qualify for a PGA Tour event at the 1952 Phoenix Open, using an invitation obtained by former World heavyweight boxing champion Joe Louis. Sifford was subjected to threats and racial abuse there and at other tournaments.

In 1957, Sifford won the Long Beach Open, which was not an official PGA Tour event, but was co-sponsored by the PGA and had some well-known white players in the field. Sifford competed in the U. S. Open in 1959 for the first time, and tied for 32nd place. He became a member of the Tour in 1961, thus becoming the first African-American to join the PGA Tour. He went on to win two official money events, the 1967 Greater Hartford Open and the 1969 Los Angeles Open, and finished in the top 60 in overall winnings in his first nine years as a member of the PGA Tour. He also won the 1963 Puerto Rico Open and at the 1971 Sea Pines. He tied for 21st place at the 1972 U.S. Open, his best finish in a major tournament. He competed in the PGA Seniors' Championship, then the leading tournament for golfers over fifty, winning the event in 1975.

Personal life
Sifford's wife, Rose, died in 1998. They had two sons, Charles Jr. and Craig.

Sifford, a resident of Brecksville, Ohio, was hospitalized for a stroke one month prior to his death in Cleveland, Ohio. He died on February 3, 2015, at the age of 92.

Honors
Lee Trevino said of Sifford, "You have to put him in the Jackie Robinson category." Tiger Woods named his son Charlie after him and referred to Sifford as "the Grandpa I never had," and that, without Sifford, "I probably wouldn't be here. My dad would have never have picked up the game. Who knows if the clause would still exist or not? But he broke it down."

In 2004, Sifford became the first African American inducted into the World Golf Hall of Fame. He chose Hall of Fame member South African Gary Player to present him for induction. On June 22, 2006, he received an honorary degree from the University of St Andrews as a Doctor of Laws. He also received the 2007 Old Tom Morris Award from the Golf Course Superintendents Association of America (GCSAA), the GCSAA's highest honor.

In 2009, the Northern Trust Open created an exemption for a player who represents the advancement of diversity in golf; it is named in honor of Sifford and is referred to as the Charlie Sifford Exemption.

In 2011, Mecklenburg County Park and Recreation changed the name of Revolution Park Golf Course to Dr. Charles L. Sifford Golf Course at Revolution Park.

President Barack Obama awarded him the 2014 Presidential Medal of Freedom.

Professional wins (22)

PGA Tour wins (2)

PGA Tour playoff record (1–0)

Other wins (12)
1952 UGA National Negro Open
1953 UGA National Negro Open
1954 UGA National Negro Open
1955 UGA National Negro Open
1956 UGA National Negro Open, Rhode Island Open
1957 Long Beach Open
1960 UGA National Negro Open, Almaden Open (unofficial win – one year prior to becoming a PGA Tour event)
1963 Puerto Rico Open
1971 Sea Pines
1975 Northern Ohio PGA Championship

Senior PGA Tour wins (1)

Other senior wins (7)
1975 PGA Seniors' Championship – (5 years prior to becoming a Champions Tour event; event is now a Champions Tour major)
1988 Liberty Mutual Legends of Golf – Legendary Division (with Roberto De Vicenzo)
1989 Liberty Mutual Legends of Golf – Legendary Division (with Roberto De Vicenzo)
1991 Liberty Mutual Legends of Golf – Legendary Division (with Roberto De Vicenzo)
1998 Liberty Mutual Legends of Golf – Demaret Division (with Joe Jimenez)
1999 Liberty Mutual Legends of Golf – Demaret Division (with Joe Jimenez)
2000 Liberty Mutual Legends of Golf – Demaret Division (with Joe Jimenez)

Results in major championships

CUT = missed the half-way cut
"T" indicates a tie for a place
Note: Sifford never played in the Masters Tournament or The Open Championship.

References

Bibliography

Further reading

External links

American male golfers
African-American golfers
PGA Tour golfers
PGA Tour Champions golfers
World Golf Hall of Fame inductees
Golfers from Charlotte, North Carolina
Presidential Medal of Freedom recipients
Sportspeople from Shaker Heights, Ohio
People from Brecksville, Ohio
1922 births
2015 deaths
20th-century African-American sportspeople
21st-century African-American people